Berry Haworth Durston  (1 August 1940 – 19 January 2007) was an Australian rower. He competed in the men's eight event at the 1960 Summer Olympics.

References

1940 births
2007 deaths
Australian male rowers
Olympic rowers of Australia
Rowers at the 1960 Summer Olympics
Rowers from Western Australia
Members of the Order of Australia
20th-century Australian people